The 1978 Clemson Tigers football team was an American football team that represented Clemson University in the Atlantic Coast Conference (ACC) during the 1978 NCAA Division I-A football season. In its second season under head coach Charley Pell, the team compiled an 11–1 record (6–0 against conference opponents), won the ACC championship, defeated Ohio State in the 1978 Gator Bowl, was ranked No. 6 in the final AP and Coaches Polls, and outscored opponents by a total of 368 to 131. The team played its home games at Memorial Stadium in Clemson, South Carolina.

Steve Fuller and Randy Scott were the team captains. The team's statistical leaders included Steve Fuller with 1,515 passing yards, Lester Brown with 1,022 rushing yards and 102 points scored, and Jerry Butler with 908 receiving yards.

The Gator Bowl victory became infamous due to the fact that Ohio State's legendary head coach Woody Hayes punched Clemson player Charlie Bauman during the game on the Buckeyes sideline after a play. The incident was caught on live television, and Hayes resigned as Ohio State head coach the next day before the team even left Jacksonville. Hayes would never coach again.

Schedule

Personnel

Season summary

Gator Bowl (vs. Ohio State)

References

Clemson
Clemson Tigers football seasons
Atlantic Coast Conference football champion seasons
Gator Bowl champion seasons
Clemson Tigers football